Arthur Malcolm Trustram Eve, 1st Baron Silsoe  (8 April 1894 – 3 December 1976), known as Sir Malcolm Trustram Eve, 1st Baronet, from 1943 to 1963, was a British barrister and First Church Estates Commissioner.

Biography
Eve was the son of Sir Herbert Trustram Eve KBE (1865–1937), President of the Rating Surveyors Association, and Fanny Jean, daughter of Rev. John Robert Turing of Edwinstowe, Nottinghamshire. He was a nephew of Arthur Stewart Eve and cousin of Alan Turing. He was educated at Winchester College and Christ Church, Oxford.

First World War
In the First World War he was commissioned into the Royal Welch Fusiliers and served at Gallipoli, and in Egypt and Palestine, being awarded the Military Cross and reaching the rank of Captain. He was called to the Bar from the Inner Temple, in 1919, became a King's Counsel in 1935 and Master of the Bench in 1943. He was chairman of the Air Transport Licensing Authority from 1938 to 1939. He remained in the Territorial Army after the war, reaching the rank of Brigadier.

Second World War
In the Second World War, Eve served with the armed forces from 1939 to 1941, before being appointed chairman of the War Damage Commission (1941), War Works Commission (1945), Local Government Boundary Commission (1945) and Central Land Board (1947). He served all of these organisations until 1949.

Post-war career
From 1950 to 1953 he was chairman of the Burnham Committee and in 1952-53 he was President of the European Cement Association. He was a Church Commissioner from 1949, a member of the Church Assembly from 1952, and was Third Church Estates Commissioner from 1952 to 1954. In 1954, he was appointed First Church Estates Commissioner. His other appointments included chairman of St. George's Medical School (1948), president of the Ski Club of Great Britain (1950), chairman of the Cement Makers' Federation (1951), chairman of St George's Hospital (1952) and chairman of the Road Haulage Disposal Board (1953). In 1960, he headed an enquiry into the sugar industry of Fiji, prompted by the dispute between the Federation of Cane Growers and the Colonial Sugar Refining Company (CSR).

Baronet Silsoe
Eve was created a Baronet, of Silsoe in the County of Bedford, in 1943, and in 1963 he was raised to the peerage as Baron Silsoe, of Silsoe in the County of Bedford.

Personal life
Eve married Marguerite, daughter of Sir Augustus Meredith Nanton, in 1927 and they had twin sons, David and Peter, in May 1930. His first wife died in 1945 and he subsequently married Margaret Elizabeth, daughter of Henry Wallace Robertson of Ayton, Berwickshire.

Death
Lord Silsoe died in December 1976, aged 82, and was succeeded in his titles by his elder twin son David, who also became a prominent lawyer. He, in turn, was succeeded on 31 December 2005 by his son Simon Rupert Trustram Eve (b. 17 April 1966).

Honours
Military Cross
B. A. (Oxon), 1919
M. A. (Oxon), 1927
Knight Grand Cross of The Most Excellent Order of the British Empire (Civil), 1950

References

Hankinson, C. F. J. (ed.), Debrett's Baronetage, Knightage and Companionage, 1954, Odhams Press, 1954
Silsoe, Lord, Sixty Years a Welsh Territorial, Dyfed, Wales: Gomer Press, 1976

1894 births
1976 deaths
People educated at Winchester College
Alumni of Christ Church, Oxford
Knights Grand Cross of the Order of the British Empire
Members of the Inner Temple
Royal Welch Fusiliers officers
Recipients of the Military Cross
British Army personnel of World War I
British King's Counsel
British Army personnel of World War II
English Anglicans
Hereditary barons created by Elizabeth II
Church Estates Commissioners